Magic, Science and Religion and Other Essays is a 1948 anthropological book by the Polish scholar Bronisław Malinowski, collecting a number of his essays published in the earlier years.

References 

1948 non-fiction books
Books by Bronisław Malinowski
Anthropology books